The 2009 SAT Bangkok Open was a professional tennis tournament played on indoor hard courts. It was part of the 2009 ATP Challenger Tour. It took place in Bangkok, Thailand between 16 and 22 March 2009.

Singles entrants

Seeds

Rankings are as of March 9, 2009.

Other entrants
The following players received wildcards into the singles main draw:
  Guillermo Coria
  Grigor Dimitrov
  Peerakit Siributwong
  Kittipong Wachiramanowong

The following players received entry from the qualifying draw:
  Rohan Bopanna
  Im Kyu-tae
  Noam Okun
  Tim Smyczek

The following player received special exempt into the main draw:
  Sergei Bubka
  Takao Suzuki

Champions

Men's singles

 Florian Mayer def.  Danai Udomchoke, 7–5, 6–2

Men's doubles

 Joshua Goodall /  Joseph Sirianni def.  Mikhail Elgin /  Alexander Kudryavtsev, 6–3, 6–1

External links
2009 Draws

 
 ATP Challenger Tour
Tennis, ATP Challenger Tour, SAT Bangkok Open
Tennis, ATP Challenger Tour, SAT Bangkok Open

Tennis, ATP Challenger Tour, SAT Bangkok Open